Woman's Gotta Have It is the second album by Cornershop, released in 1995.

Recording and release
The song My Dancing Days Are Done is performed in French (mes jours de bal perdus) by the guest singers Parsley and Sasha Andres. The album's style is a blend of indie rock with Indian music.

The opening track 6am Jullandar Shere, sung in Punjabi, as well as Wog were released as singles. A video for the former was sometimes played on MTV Europe's alternative music slots.

Reception

Reviewing the album on AllMusic, Denise Sullivan called the style "Hindi-Pop".

Track listing

Personnel 
 Tjinder Singh – vocals, bass
 Avtar Singh – guitar
 Ben Ayres – guitar
 Wallis Healey – guitar
 Anthony "Saffs" Saffery – sitar, keyboards
 Nick Simms – drums
 Pete Hall – percussion
 Parsley – vocals
 Sasha Andres – vocals

Technical
 Tjinder Singh – production 
 Charlie – engineering
 Mike Marsh – mastering
 Ben Ayres – artwork
 Alison – artwork

References

1995 albums
Cornershop albums
Wiiija albums